Strepsinoma albiplagialis is a moth in the family Crambidae. It was described by Walter Rothschild in 1915. It is found in New Guinea.

Its wingspan is about 20mm. The forewings are mouse grey, with a white triangular postmedian patch. The hindwings are mouse grey.

References

Acentropinae
Moths described in 1915